Gorges Edmond Howard (1715–1786) was a miscellaneous Irish writer. He wrote on the law and created literary works.

Biography
Gorges Edmond Howard was the son of Captain Francis Howard (of dragoons) and  Elizabeth (born Jackson). He was born in  Coleraine on 28 August 1715 and educated at Thomas Sheridan's school in Dublin.

Howard became an apprentice in the exchequer at Dublin and after a dalliance with becoming a soldier, he perserevered and became a solicitor. He secured a lucrative business as a solicitor and land agent, and published professional works at his own expense. He failed to achieve notability as a writer and he was satirised by Robert Jephson for his unsolicited productivity. Jephson invented a mock correspondence between George Faulkner and Howard, allegedly encouraged by Lord Townshend.

Howard was active in suggesting improvements in Dublin, having some skill as an architect. The freedom of the city was conferred on him in 1766. He died in Dublin in June 1786.

His daughter Anne married her second cousin, Hamilton Gorges, and started a branch of the Gorges family that continued to use "Howard" as their middle name.

Selected works 
 A Collection of Apothegms and Maxims for the Good Conduct of Life, .. 1767
 Almeyda, or the Rival Kings, 1769
 The Siege of Tamor, 1773
 The Female Gamester, 1778
 Miscellaneous Works in Verse and Prose, 1782

Also numerous works on the law.

References

External links
 
 

18th-century Irish lawyers
People from Coleraine, County Londonderry
1786 deaths
1715 births
18th-century Irish writers